Mohamed Sami El-Khatib (born 1 February 1936) is an Egyptian former sports shooter. He competed in the 50 metre rifle, prone event at the 1964 Summer Olympics.

References

1936 births
Living people
Egyptian male sport shooters
Olympic shooters of Egypt
Shooters at the 1964 Summer Olympics
Place of birth missing (living people)